The Ascension Cathedral, commonly known as the Serbian Orthodox Cathedral, is the cathedral of the Serbian Orthodox Eparchy of Timișoara. Located in the Union Square of Cetate district, the building is one of the three Serbian Orthodox churches in the city together with the St. George Church in Fabric district and the St. Nicholas Church in the Avram Iancu Square of Mehala district.

History 
In 1737 (according to other sources 1728), during the plague epidemic in the city, the Serbian Orthodox Cathedral that originally stood on this site burned down. The present church was built in Baroque style between 1744 and 1748 by order of the Serbian Orthodox Bishop Georgije Popović.  The church was built from the donations of the churchgoers, being made of stone and brick. In order to gain space for the larger church, a Turkish rampart that had existed since the 16th century was demolished in 1742. In 1791, when the church was restored under Bishop , it was completed with two towers, in which there are five bells, one of which weighs 800 kg.

Initially, the church was equipped with a small iconostasis by Serbian painter Stefan Tenecki. After its disposal, a new wooden iconostasis was carved by Mihajlo Janić between 1833 and 1836 and fitted with six icons, which were painted by Konstantin Danil between 1838 and 1843. Alexander Tepferer gilded the wood carvings in 1839. The outer wall facing Union Square was built in 1822, while the wrought-iron gate facing Emanoil Ungureanu Street was constructed in 1886. The Pantocrator and the Four Evangelists were created in 1903 as the work of the painter Stevan Aleksić. The ornaments of the church were designed by Josef Habinger.

Seven bishops are buried in the church, and several dignitaries who donated their fortune to the church also rest in the nave. Initially, the church hosted Orthodox religious services for both the Serbian and Romanian communities, but since 1864, following the separation of the two churches, the building belongs to the Serbian community. Romanian Orthodox and Serbian Orthodox believers are equally welcome to church services today.

References 

Religious buildings and structures in Timișoara
Baroque church buildings in Romania
Serbian Orthodox church buildings in Romania
Historic monuments in Timiș County
Churches completed in 1748
Eastern Orthodox cathedrals in Romania